Capital News is an American drama television series that aired on ABC in 1990.  Starring Lloyd Bridges, Helen Slater, and William Russ (Boy Meets World) Capital News was created by David Milch and Christian Williams.

Synopsis
The series focused on the editorial staff and writers of the Washington, D.C.-based daily newspaper The Washington Capital (a fictional publication inspired by the actual Washington Post).  It was produced by MTM Enterprises.

The series consisted of one TV movie (also considered as the pilot) and twelve regular episodes, of which only three were shown on its initial run in the United States, after which ABC canceled the series. However, at least in Germany, Hong Kong, the Netherlands and the UK, all 13 episodes were shown on television in 1990 and 1991.

Cast
 Mark Blum as Edison King, national editor who stalked the corridors of governmental power, uncovering scandal and abuse
 Lloyd Bridges as Jonathan Joseph "Jo Jo" Turner, Washington Capital editor-in-chief who runs the newspaper with a firm hand, alternately encouraging and admonishing his dedicated, hard-working reporters  
 Christian Clemenson as Todd Lunden, reporter 
 Chelsea Field as Cassy Swann, reporter 
 Kurt Fuller as Miles Plato, flamboyant syndicated gossip columnist
 Charles Levin as Vinnie DiSalvo
 Richard Murphy as Richie Fineberg
 Wendell Pierce as Conrad White, a black reporter assigned to the local desk 
 Daniel Roebuck as Haskell Epstein
 William Russ as Redmond Dunne, crusading metro reporter
 Helen Slater as Anne McKenna, an eager younger reporter from San Diego, California who is assigned to the metro desk who is taken under the wing of Redmond Dunne 
 Michael Woods as Clay Gibson, metro editor who explored the steamy underside of Washington, "America's murder and drug capital" 
 Jenny Wright as Doreen Duncan
 Luke Edwards as Clay Gibson jr.
Recurring 
 Shelley Long as Kelly
 Matthew Lillard as Sid

Episodes

References

External links
  (Television film)
 
 Capital News at TVGuide.com

1990s American drama television series
1990 American television series debuts
1990 American television series endings
American Broadcasting Company original programming
English-language television shows
Television series about journalism
Television series by MTM Enterprises
Television series created by David Milch
Television shows set in Washington, D.C.